The 2019 Women's NORCECA Volleyball Championship was the 26th edition of the tournament, and was played from 8 October to 13 October 2019 in San Juan, Puerto Rico. The Dominican Republic defeated the United States by 3–2 to win the Continental Championship. Puerto Rico, Canada, Mexico, and the Dominican Republic qualified for the NORCECA Olympic Qualifier, which will see the four teams compete for a spot in the 2020 Olympics. Dominican Brayelin Martínez earned the Most Valuable Player award.

Competing nations
The following national teams have qualified:

Squads

Pool standing procedure
 Number of matches won
 Match points
 Points ratio
 Sets ratio
 Result of the last match between the tied teams

Match won 3–0: 5 match points for the winner, 0 match points for the loser
Match won 3–1: 4 match points for the winner, 1 match point for the loser
Match won 3–2: 3 match points for the winner, 2 match points for the loser

Preliminary round

Pool A

Pool B

Final round

Quarterfinals

Classification 5th–8th places

Semifinals

Seventh place match

Fifth place match

Bronze medal match

Final

Final standing

All-Star team

Most Valuable Player

Best Spikers

Best Middle Blockers

Best Setter

Best Opposite

Best Scorer

Best Server

Best Libero

Best Digger

Best Receiver

References

External links

Women's NORCECA Volleyball Championship
NORCECA
International volleyball competitions hosted by Puerto Rico
NORCECA
NORCECA